Żelichów may refer to the following places:
Żelichów, Lesser Poland Voivodeship (south Poland)
Żelichów, Łódź Voivodeship (central Poland)
Żelichów, West Pomeranian Voivodeship (north-west Poland)